Hannes Hempel (6 October 1973) is an Austrian former cyclist. He won the Austrian National Road Race Championships in 1999.

References

External links
 

1973 births
Living people
Austrian male cyclists
Sportspeople from Klagenfurt